The Speaker of the Legislative Assembly of Manitoba is the presiding officer of the provincial legislature.

List of speakers of the Legislative Assembly of Manitoba

References
 Biographies of Living Members
 Biographies of Deceased Members

Politics of Manitoba
Manitoba